This is a list of women artists who were born in the Philippines or whose artworks are closely associated with that country. These artists also explore issues within the Philippines as well as those experienced by the Filipino diaspora.

A
Pacita Abad (1946–2004), painter
Faye Abantao, visual artist
Ambie Abaño (born 1967), printmaker
Agnes Arellano, Philippine sculptor
Martha Atienza (born 1981), installation, video artist

B
Karina Baluyut (active since 2004), painter
Fatima Baquiran (born 1971), painter
Norma Belleza (born 1939), painter
Nice Buenaventura

C
Imelda Cajipe-Endaya (born 1949), painter, printmaker, mixed-media installation artist, curator, art project organiser and writer, activist
Paulina Constancia (born 1970), Filipino-Canadian painter
Lena Cobangbang, contemporary artist
Marina Cruz, Painter
Xyza Cruz Bacani (born 1987), Filipina street photographer and documentary photographer

D
Camille Dela Rosa (born 1982), visual artist
Kiri Dalena (born 1975), visual artist
Kathleen Sareena Dagum

E 

 Patricia Perez Eustaquio, visual artist

F 

 Brenda Fajardo, Philippine painter and graphic artist
 Corinne Fernandez Garcia
 Jade Fulgar

G 

 Ofelia Gelvezon-Tequi (born June 4, 1944), visual artist
 Antonette Go, theater actress

H 

 Johanna Helmuth

J
Geraldine Javier (born 1970), contemporary artist

L
Lenore RS Lim, printmaker
Lou Lim (born 1989), visual artist
Julie Lluch, sculptor

M
Lisa Macuja-Elizalde (born 1964), prima ballerina
Lani Maestro, Filipino-Canadian artist
Anita Magsaysay-Ho (1914–2012), painter
Joy Mallari (born 1966), painter, visual artist
Pelagia Mendoza y Gotianquin (1867–1939), sculptor, first women to study at the Escuela de Dibujo y Pintura
Maningning Miclat (1972–2000), Chinese-Filipino poet, painter
Keiye Miranda (active since 1995), painter

N 

 Wawi Navarroza, Photographer
 Julieanne Ng, visual artist

O
Karen Ocampo-Flores, visual artist
Aze Ong, textile artist
Marge Organo, glass artist

P
Satine Phoenix (born 1980), Filipino-American illustrator, painter, model
Paz Paterno (1867–1914), Filipino painter
Henrielle Pagkaliwangan, artist, printmaker

Q 

 Christina “Ling” Quisumbing Ramilo
 Yvonne Quisumbing

R 

 Alice Reyes (born 1942), dancer

S
Nena Saguil (1914–1994), visual artist
Gini Cruz Santos (born 1966), animator
Lilay Sarreal
Angela Silva, printmaker
Maxine Syjuco (born 1984), poet, visual artist

T
Tekla Tamoria, artist
Patis Tesoro, fashion designer
Ea Torrado, contemporary dancer
Josephine Turalba, multi-disciplinary artist
Virginia Ty-Navarro (1924–1996), sculptor
Tyang Karyel, contemporary artist

V 

 Valen Valero

Y 

 Yeo Kaa, visual artist
 Catherine Sarah Young

Z
Carmen Zaragoza y Rojas (1867–1943), painter

See also
Filipino women artists

-
Filipino women artists, List of
Artists, List of Filipino
Artists